El Ayyat is a city in the Giza Governorate, Egypt. Its population was estimated at about 44,000 people in 2018.

Etymology 

The city was formerly known as Kafr al-Ayyat.

The word Ayyat comes from the Egyptian Arabic word "عياط" which means he who cries. According to Coptic tradition the city was called by that name because a criminal attacked during their stay in Egypt, however baby Jesus made him paralyzed so he was forced to stay with the holy family and they fed him. However, he was forced to eat like a dog, since he couldn't move his arms or legs and that made him cry and people usually went there to see this supernatural event with their eyes. Thus, this place was called after him. After, the Holy Family left the place however, the criminal was cured.

History 

The ancient village of Lisht,  the capital of Pharaonic Egypt during the Middle Kingdom, is located near Al-Ayat. It was called in the Pharaonic era “It-Tawy,” meaning holding on the two lands. The region is an extension of the famous archeological cemetery of Memphis, located south of the Dahshur region, 50 km south of Cairo From the south of the Meidum region the last extension of the necropolis of Memphis.

It was King Amenemhat I who established this City where he built his Funerary complex consisting of the Valley Temple, the Ascending Road and the funerary temple and the pyramid named in and around it. There are tombs dedicated to the senior statesmen of his era, some of which were revealed at the beginning of the last century by an American archaeological mission. After Amenemhat I, his son Senusret I came to power, and he also established his Funerary complex in parallel to the present Saudi village. The group consisted of the Valley Temple, the Ascending Road, and a funerary temple in addition to his pyramid. The high priest Senusret Ankh.

And the project that the council is currently implementing includes reducing the percentage of groundwater to ensure that it does not affect the two royal burial chambers inside the two pyramids in particular, in addition to restoration of the inscriptions of Senusert Ankh cemetery which contain hundreds of spells and texts of the pyramids, which include the dogmatic history of the Egyptian religion along with restoration of The mortuary temple of Senusert I in which a royal life-sized statue of King Senusert I was found.

Among the newly discovered tombs is that the grave of "Het Hatab" and the region is still has not been excavated for more than a century. The archaeologists emphasized that the history of the middle state is still buried in this region, and they see the solutions to the existing problems, the most important of which is to reduce the level of groundwater on the two burial chambers inside the two hills, which will lead to real beginning of archaeological excavation.

Location 

El Ayyat is located to the south of Giza, and it is limited to four borders to the east, the Nile River, to the west, Faiyum Governorate, to the north, the Badrashein Center, and to the south, the Al-Wasta Center of the Governorate of Beni Suef.

Villages 

It includes 39 villages and from the north: Al-Ayat Al-Danaweh village and the village of Kafr Al-Rifai (the first two villages in the center of Al-Ayat from the north and directly after the village of Mazghouna) and the village of Al-Naseriya and Kafr Barakat and the village of Kafr Turk, Behbeit and the village of Brecht, Matania, Kafr Ammar, Al-Atef and the facility Fadel, Blida, and Jerzah, Al-Qatoori, Saudi Arabia, Bedif, Al-Dabaa, Kafr Al-Rifai, Western Raqqa, Al-Musanadah, and other villages.

Economy

Industry 
The City contains factory for oils and soaps. It is planned to establish a complete industrial zone on the land of Al-Ayyat, in the west side of the center in the desert region between Al-Ayyat and Fayyoum, but the Egyptian-Kuwaiti company seized that land by way of a contract to sell by direct order that resembled many legal abuses and no projects were established in That land so far.

Service 
Al-Ayat suffers from several problems that are overwhelming its residents, such as water and sanitation, lack of transportation.

Transportation 
Public transportation between the Subdivisions of Egyptmarkaz and Greater Cairo is either by microbus or from a railway station where only the slow train stops. There are two lanes in which the market will be held on Sunday, And for bad insurance, Al-Ayyat Markaz has witnessed several catastrophic train accidents, the most famous of which are:

 The Upper Egypt train fire accident in 2002
 2009 Al-Ayat train collision
 And the incident in Bled, Blida, on 01/31/2016

References 

Populated places in Giza Governorate